Water on Earth may refer to:

Origin of water on Earth
Water distribution on Earth

Water